Acutipetala is a small genus of southeast Asian funnel weavers native to the evergreen forests of northern Thailand. The eyes are in two rows, both of which are strongly curved forward.

The genus was first described by P. Dankittipakul and Z. S. Zhang in 2008, and  it contains only two species: A. donglini and A. octoginta. The name is a combination of the Latin "acutus", meaning "sharp", and the Greek "petalon", in reference to the sharp, flower petal shape of the medial apophysis of the male pedipalp.

See also
 List of Agelenidae species

References

Agelenidae genera
Arthropods of Thailand
Endemic fauna of Thailand
Spiders of Asia